The 1981–82 Sussex County Football League season was the 57th in the history of Sussex County Football League a football competition in England.

Division One

Division One featured 14 clubs which competed in the division last season, along with two new clubs, promoted from Division Two:
Hailsham Town
Whitehawk

League table

Division Two

Division Two featured twelve clubs which competed in the division last season, along with four new clubs:
Bexhill Town, relegated from Division One
Hassocks, joined from the Brighton, Hove & District League
Midhurst & Easebourne, joined from the West Sussex League
Portfield, relegated from Division One

League table

References

1981-82
1981–82 in English football leagues